Norm or Norman King may refer to:

 Norm King (1919–1992), Australian Labor Party politician
 Norman King (bowls), English international lawn bowler
 Norman King (cricketer) (1915–1973), Australian cricketer
 Norman King (New Zealand politician) (1914–2002), New Zealand Labour Party politician
 Norman King (Royal Navy officer) (1933–2013), British admiral